Au Li Yen (born 1 April 1982) is a Malaysian gymnast. She competed at the 2000 Summer Olympics.

References

External links
 

1982 births
Living people
Malaysian female artistic gymnasts
Olympic gymnasts of Malaysia
Gymnasts at the 2000 Summer Olympics
Place of birth missing (living people)